John Coleridge may refer to:

 John Coleridge, 1st Baron Coleridge (1820–1894), British lawyer, judge and Liberal politician
 John Coleridge (Indian Army officer) (1878–1951) 
 John Taylor Coleridge (1790–1876), English judge